Fruitland Township is a township in Muscatine County, Iowa, United States.

History
Fruitland Township was organized on November 9, 1887.

References

Townships in Muscatine County, Iowa
Townships in Iowa
1887 establishments in Iowa